Guglielmo Gaddi (1599–1652) was a Roman Catholic prelate who served as Bishop of Bisceglie (1643–1652).

Biography
Guglielmo Gaddi was born in Forlì, Italy in 1599.
On 31 August 1643, he was appointed during the papacy of Pope Urban VIII as Bishop of Bisceglie.
On 27 September 1643, he was consecrated bishop by Antonio Marcello Barberini, Cardinal-Priest of Sant'Onofrio. 
He served as Bishop of Bisceglie until his death in 1652.

References

External links and additional sources

 (for Chronology of Bishops) 
 (for Chronology of Bishops) 

17th-century Italian Roman Catholic bishops
Bishops appointed by Pope Urban VIII
1599 births
1652 deaths